Franco Nicolás Sivetti (born 30 May 1998) is an Argentine professional footballer who plays as a midfielder for Almagro.

Career
Sivetti's senior career began with Argentine Primera División side Estudiantes in 2018, he joined them from Club América de General Piran years prior. He was selected in their senior squad for the 2018–19 season by manager Leandro Benítez, with the midfielder's first inclusion occurring during a Copa Argentina match with San Lorenzo on 3 October; he was an unused substitute as Estudiantes lost 1–3. Sivetti made his professional debut days later in a league defeat to Tigre, he was substituted off for Mariano Pavone on sixty-four minutes. In February 2021, Sivetti was loaned out to Guillermo Brown until the end of the year.

On 8 December 2021 Club Almagro confirmed, that Sivetti had signed a deal with the club until the end of 2023.

Career statistics
.

References

External links

1998 births
Living people
Sportspeople from Buenos Aires Province
Argentine footballers
Association football midfielders
Argentine Primera División players
Primera Nacional players
Estudiantes de La Plata footballers
Guillermo Brown de Puerto Madryn footballers
Club Almagro players